Albania and Canada are members of the North Atlantic Treaty Organization (NATO). Canada supports Albania in its euro-integration path.

Canada's Ambassador in Rome is accredited to Albania, while an Honorary Consulate in Tirana assists Canadian interests in Albania.

History 

Both countries established diplomatic relations on 10 September 1987. In April 2001, the Albanian embassy was opened for the first time in Ottawa. This act helped on strengthening the relations between Canada and Albania. The year 2012 was named as "Year of Albania" in Canada, on the occasion of the 100th anniversary of Independence.
Many activities were held by the Albanian community in Canada, which highlighted the friendship and ties between the countries.

Relations and cooperation 

Canada's exports to Albania in 2013 amounted to $36.84 million, with machinery, iron and steel products, animal products and tools counting among the top exports. Canadian imports from Albania totaled $6.37 million, mainly in footwear, iron and steel products, apparel and grain.

See also 
 Foreign relations of Albania
 Foreign relations of Canada
 Albanian Canadians

References 

 
Canada
Bilateral relations of Canada